Lethata illustra is a moth of the family Depressariidae. It is found in Peru.

The wingspan is 27–32 mm. The forewings are brown shaded with darker brown on the basal two-thirds and with the costa narrowly ochreous. There is a spot at the end of the cell, consisting of a ring of purplish scales enclosing a white spot. There is also a faint, outwardly curving transverse line from the costa above the spot to near the tornus. The entire wing is sprinkled with fuscous scales. The hindwings are whitish overcast with grey.

References

Moths described in 1967
Lethata